= Arthur Elkins =

English footballer

Personal information
- Full name: Arthur Elkins
- Date of birth: 1880
- Place of birth: Grimsby, England
- Date of death: 1920 (aged 39–40)
- Position: Forward

Senior career*
Years	Team	Apps	(Gls)
1903–1904	Grimsby Town	18	(7)
- * Club domestic league appearances and goals

Arthur Elkins (1880 – 1920) was an English professional footballer who played as a forward.
